Daniel Kanayo Daniel (born 22 May 1986) is a Nigerian television and film actor, model, voice-over artiste and events compere. He is best known for his portrayal of Bossman  in the movie A Soldier's Story, for which he won the 2016 Africa Magic Viewers' Choice Awards (AMVCA) and the Africa Movie Academy Awards (AMAA) awards for Best Actor, as well as his roles in the period piece 76, which also starred Ramsey Noah, Chidi Mokeme and Rita Dominic and the light-hearted Mummy Dearest alongside veteran Nigerian actress Liz Benson. He was one of two Nollywood actors inducted into the Academy of Motion Pictures and Science class of 2022.

Early life
Daniel Kanayo Daniel was born at the University of Maiduguri Teaching Hospital, Maiduguri, Borno State, in Northeastern Nigeria on  22 May 1986.

While Daniel was a toddler, his family relocated to Lagos State in Southwest Nigeria and then to the Southeast State of Enugu, where he began his formal education. Daniel is of Igbo descent and is a native of Nenwe in Ani-Nri Local Government Area of Enugu State. He was brought up in a Christian home. His father, Chris Daniel was an engineer and his mother Kande Daniel is a Broadcast Journalist and former National President of Nigeria Association of Women Journalists, and currently serves as the Special Adviser to the Nigerian Minister of Power on Media Matters. He is the first of four children, one of whom is Chris Daniel Jnr (Kris'D) a musician and performing artist.

Daniel led the drama and debating club of his primary school, Command Children School. Almost always at the top of his class, he graduated into secondary school in 1996. He enrolled in Command Day Secondary School Enugu, and later transferred to Federal Government College Enugu in 1999 to complete his senior secondary education.

Daniel had desired to train as a pilot, having had three role model fighter pilots in his family: his foster grandfather, former Chief of Air Staff, (Late) Air Marshal Ibrahim Alfa, and his three uncles – Squadron Leader John Chukwu, Air Vice-Marshal Chris Chukwu, and Shu'aibu Alfa (a civil pilot). Daniel's hopes were dashed when he was diagnosed with myopia (short sightedness) and was told it would be difficult to achieve his dream with poor eyesight. At this time his father moved to Port Harcourt, Rivers State in South-south Nigeria, while his mother moved to the Federal Capital Territory (FCT) Abuja, on separate national assignments. He then got admission into the Nnamdi Azikiwe University Awka, Anambra State in 2004 to study Applied Biochemistry.

In November 2004, Daniel's life changed for good as he lost his father in a ghastly auto crash and being the first child, he had to grow up quickly. In 2005 his family relocated to Abuja after his father’s death in Port Harcourt while his studies continued in Nnamdi Azikiwe University where he also started his modelling career. He graduated from the University in 2009 and managed his uncle’s business Twinkles Catering Service, the pioneer eatery in Gusau, Zamfara State for four months.

Career

Daniel started his modelling career while in school, doing a couple of Television commercials for Zandas Cosmetics. In 2009 when he returned to Abuja from the university, he took part in a few runway shows including the Abuja Moroccan Fashion Show. After one of the shows, Supermodel Steiner Eunice Opara, dragged a reluctant Daniel to a movie audition. The directors – Kabat Esosa Egbon and Tola Balogun were impressed by Daniel’s talent and gave him his very first acting job in the Television series All About Us.

He then got cast for a BBC (British Broadcasting Corporation) movie titled Sarah’s Choice, directed by Mak Kusare in which he starred alongside OC Ukeje, Seun Dada and Sylvia Oluchi. After the success of Sarah’s Choice, Daniel took on the role of the antagonist in the Amstel Malta Box Office produced movie, The Child, directed by Izu Ojukwu in which he starred alongside Joke Silva, Alex Usifo, Bukky Ajayi, and Wole Ojo. Afterwards he gained the lead role in the hit movie, Ladies' Men, directed by Afam Okereke, also starring Mercy Johnson, Funke Akindele, Queen Nwokoye, Ruth Kadiri, Alex Ekubo, Chigozie Atuanya.

Daniel took a break from his newfound acting career in February 2010 to go for his National Youth Service, which is a mandatory requirement for Nigerian University graduates. He then worked with the Independent National Electoral Commission (INEC) in Abuja the Federal Capital Territory as part of his youth service.

He returned to acting in 2011 at the end of his Youth Service program and starred in a plethora of movies including Under which was shot in Ghana, Ivie, Same Difference, Paint My Life, Tempest, Lions of 76, Jujuwood, Body of the King, Book of Magic, Matchmaker, Spirit Girl, Devil in Red, Girl, Mummy Dearest, Bambitious and others. He has also starred in a number of Television Series such as My Treasure, Spider and Car Hire. Daniel was also part of the cast in the British Broadcasting Corporation (BBC) radio drama series – Story Story and Neighbor My Neighbor.

Awards and recognitions
In 2014 Daniel was nominated for the City People Awards, Best New Actor of the Year category, an award he went on to win. Daniel was also nominated for the Best of Nollywood Awards (BON), Revelation of the Year Category in 2014, which he won

On 5 March 2016, Daniel won the Award for Best Actor in a (Drama) at the Africa Magic Viewers' Choice Awards (AMVCA) 2016 edition, for his role in the Nigerian war thriller A Soldier's Story. In the same year, Daniel also won the 12th Africa Movie Academy Awards award for Best Actor in a Leading Role for the same movie.

In June 2022, he and Funke Akindele were the only Nollywood actors invited into the Academy of Motion Pictures and Science class of 2022.

Awards

Filmography

Movie roles

Television roles

References

Nigerian male film actors
Nigerian male television actors
1986 births
Living people
People from Borno State
Igbo male actors
Igbo male models
Federal Government College Enugu alumni
Nigerian film award winners
Nigerian male models
Nigerian television personalities
Actors from Enugu State
21st-century Nigerian male actors